Alpha Wolf is an Australian metalcore band originally from Burnie, Tasmania and currently located in Melbourne, Victoria. Bassist/founding vocalist John Arnold stated that "the name Alpha Wolf came from the movie The Grey". Their debut album Mono was released in July 2017 and peaked at number 29 on the ARIA Albums Chart.

Biography

Formation and Origin (2013-2016) 
The band formed in 2013 and released their debut EP Origin on 9 June 2014.
The EP was preceded by three singles.

Mono and line-up change (2017-2018) 
In July 2017, the band's 2017 released its debut studio album titled, Mono. This is short for monochromatic, which means, "involving or producing visual images in a single color or in varying tones of a single color". This title and its association tease the lyrical content which deals strongly in themes of trauma and depression.

On 9 February 2018, lead vocalist Aidan Ellaz was ejected from the band due to allegations of sexual assault. In June 2018, Lochie Keogh and Mitch Fogarty were announced as new members.

Fault and A Quiet Place to Die (2019-Present) 
In April 2019, the band released Fault EP, with guitarist Sabian Lynch saying "Fault is our way of opening up, and doing our best to show that it's okay to mess up, it's okay to fail, it's okay make mistakes, as long as we can find ways grow from it. We always want to be honest with our song writing and these songs showcase a realisation within ourselves, thus creating the best music we've ever been a part of."

The band's second studio album, A Quiet Place to Die was released on September 25, 2020.

Members
Current members
 Sabian Lynch – rhythm guitar (2013–present)
 John Arnold – bass, backing vocals (2016–present), lead vocals (2013–2016)
 Scottie Simpson – lead guitar (2016–present), bass (2015–2016)
 Mitch Fogarty – drums (2018–present)
 Lochie Keogh – lead vocals (2018–present)

Former members
 Hayden Dargavel – bass (2013–2015)
 Lloyd Hornidge – lead guitar (2015–2016)
 Jackson Arnold – drums (2013–2017)
 Aidan Ellaz – lead vocals (2016–2018)

Timeline

Discography

Studio albums

Extended plays

Singles

Awards

AIR Awards
The Australian Independent Record Awards (commonly known informally as AIR Awards) is an annual awards night to recognise, promote and celebrate the success of Australia's Independent Music sector.

|-
| AIR Awards of 2020
| Fault
| Best Independent Heavy Album or EP
| 
|-

ARIA Music Awards
The ARIA Music Awards is an annual ceremony presented by Australian Recording Industry Association (ARIA), which recognise excellence, innovation, and achievement across all genres of the music of Australia. They commenced in 1987.

! 
|-
| 2021|| A Quiet Place to Die || ARIA Award for Best Hard Rock or Heavy Metal Album || 
| 
|-

References

External links

Australian heavy metal musical groups
Australian nu metal musical groups
Musical groups established in 2013
Musicians from Tasmania
Australian metalcore musical groups
Victoria (Australia) musical groups
2013 establishments in Australia